The League of Ireland Cup 2006 was the 33rd staging of the League of Ireland Cup.

The 2006 League Cup kicked off in April. Sixteen league clubs and the Kerry League entered the competition.  There were two clubs drawn to face each other in the first round, with the rest given byes to the second round.

First round
Match played on 3 April 2006.

Second round
Matches played between 2 May and 10 May 2006.

Quarter-finals
Matches played on 4 July and 5 July 2006.

Semi-finals

Final

External links
2006 Season in Ireland on rsssf website
2006 League Cup on FAI website

3
League of Ireland Cup seasons
Cup